LA-40 is a constituency of Azad Kashmir Legislative Assembly which is currently represented by Aamir Abdul Ghaffar Lone of Pakistan Peoples Party. It covers the area of Sindh Balochistan in Pakistan. Only refugees from Kashmir Valley settled in Pakistan are eligible to vote.

Election 2016

elections were held in this constituency on 21 July 2016.

Election 2021 
Further Information: Azad Kashmir Election 2021Amir Abdul Ghaffar Lone of Pakistan Peoples Party won the seat by getting 2165 votes.

Azad Kashmir Legislative Assembly constituencies